The Bandy World Championship Y-21 is a Youth Bandy World Championship up to the age of 21 years. Usually, only the core bandy playing nations take part. The designation is sometimes given as U-21 instead of Y-23 or U-23, probably as a way to compare it to the U-21 competitions in association football (indeed, the UEFA European Under-21 Championship was originally for under-23 teams).

History
The first two Bandy World Championships Y-23 were held in 1990 and 1992, but after this initial period, a long period existed whereby the Y-23 championship wasn't held. It was taken up again in 2011 and has been held biannually ever since.

The Russian Y23 team won the 2013 World Championship Y23, which was held in Obukhovo, Moscow Oblast, Russia. The competition ran from December 6–8. Russia defeated Sweden in the final and Finland beat Norway for the bronze medals. Kazakhstan also participated.

Results

Under-23 championships

Under-21 championships

Medal table

References

Youth 21
Recurring sporting events established in 1990